Egil Henrik Bjerklund (5 September 1933 – 29 September 2022) was a Norwegian ice hockey player. He played for the Norway national team, and participated at the Winter Olympics in 1952 and in 1964. He was awarded Gullpucken as the best Norwegian ice hockey player in 1961.

References

External links

1933 births
2022 deaths
Ice hockey players at the 1952 Winter Olympics
Ice hockey players at the 1964 Winter Olympics
Norway men's national ice hockey team coaches
Norwegian ice hockey defencemen
Norwegian ice hockey left wingers
Olympic ice hockey players of Norway
Ice hockey people from Oslo